Prytz is a surname. Notable people with the surname include:

Agneta Prytz (1916–2008), Swedish movie and stage actress
Andreas Prytz (born 1972), Swedish curler and coach
Anton Frederik Winter Jakhelln Prytz (1878–1945), Norwegian politician
Björn Prytz (1887–1976), Swedish industrialist and Swedish envoyé in London
 Claes Johansson Prytz, of the Godunov map
Daniel Prytz (born 1975), Swedish curler
Eiler Hagerup Krog Prytz, Jr. (1883–1963), Norwegian goldsmith
Eiler Hagerup Krog Prytz, Sr. (1812–1900), Norwegian bailiff and politician
Eva Prytz (1917–1987), Norwegian opera soprano
Inge Prytz Johnson (born 1945), United States federal judge
Kåre Prytz (1926–1994), Norwegian journalist and novelist
Malou Trasthe Prytz (born 2003), Swedish singer
Maria Prytz (born 1976), Swedish curler and coach, 2014 Winter Olympian
Robert Prytz (born 1960), Swedish former footballer
Torolf Prytz (1858–1938), Norwegian architect, goldsmith and politician

See also
About Prytz family in Norway:  :no:Prytz